The 2021 ATP Tour was the global elite men's professional tennis circuit organised by the Association of Tennis Professionals (ATP) for the 2021 tennis season. The 2021 ATP Tour calendar comprised the Grand Slam tournaments (supervised by the International Tennis Federation (ITF)), the ATP Finals, the ATP Tour Masters 1000, the ATP Cup, the ATP Tour 500 series and the ATP Tour 250 series. Also included in the 2021 calendar were the Davis Cup (organised by the ITF), the Summer Olympics in Tokyo (rescheduled from 2020), Next Gen ATP Finals, Laver Cup (postponed from 2020), none of which distributed ranking points.

Schedule
This is the complete schedule of events on the 2021 calendar.

January

February

March

April

May

June

July

August

September

October

November

Affected tournaments 
The COVID-19 pandemic affected tournaments on both the ATP and WTA tours. The following tournaments were cancelled or postponed due to the COVID-19 pandemic.

Statistical information
These tables present the number of singles (S), doubles (D), and mixed doubles (X) titles won by each player and each nation during the season, within all the tournament categories of the 2021 ATP Tour: the Grand Slam tournaments, the ATP Finals, the ATP Tour Masters 1000, the ATP Tour 500 series, and the ATP Tour 250 series. The players/nations are sorted by:
 Total number of titles (a doubles title won by two players representing the same nation counts as only one win for the nation);
 Cumulated importance of those titles (one Grand Slam win equalling two Masters 1000 wins, one undefeated ATP Finals win equalling one-and-a-half Masters 1000 win, one Masters 1000 win equalling two 500 events wins, one 500 event win equalling two 250 events wins);
 A singles > doubles > mixed doubles hierarchy;
 Alphabetical order (by family names for players).

Titles won by player

Titles won by nation

Titles information
The following players won their first main circuit title in singles, doubles or mixed doubles:
Singles

 Dan Evans – Melbourne 2 (draw)
 Alexei Popyrin – Singapore (draw)
 Juan Manuel Cerúndolo – Córdoba (draw)
 Aslan Karatsev – Dubai (draw)
 Sebastian Korda – Parma (draw)
 Cameron Norrie – Los Cabos (draw)
 Carlos Alcaraz – Umag (draw)
 Ilya Ivashka – Winston-Salem (draw)
 Kwon Soon-woo – Nur Sultan (draw)
 Tommy Paul – Stockholm (draw)

Doubles

 Ariel Behar – Delray Beach (draw)
 Gonzalo Escobar – Delray Beach (draw)
 Rafael Matos – Córdoba (draw)
 Felipe Meligeni Alves – Córdoba (draw)
 Tomislav Brkić – Buenos Aires (draw)
 Aslan Karatsev – Doha (draw)
 Lloyd Glasspool – Marseille (draw)
 Harri Heliövaara – Marseille (draw)
 Lorenzo Sonego – Cagliari (draw)
 Andrea Vavassori – Cagliari (draw)
 Ivan Sabanov – Belgrade (draw)
 Matej Sabanov – Belgrade (draw)
 Andrei Vasilevski – Belgrade 2 (draw)
 Sander Arends – Båstad (draw)
 David Pel – Båstad (draw)
 William Blumberg – Newport (draw)
 Fernando Romboli – Umag (draw)
 David Vega Hernández – Umag (draw)
 Hans Hach Verdugo – Los Cabos (draw)
 Marc-Andrea Hüsler – Gstaad (draw)
 Dominic Stricker – Gstaad (draw)
 Alexander Erler – Kitzbühel (draw)
 Lucas Miedler – Kitzbühel (draw)
 Reilly Opelka – Atlanta (draw)
 Jannik Sinner – Atlanta (draw)
 Jan Zieliński – Metz (draw)

Mixed Doubles
 Joe Salisbury – French Open (draw)
 Neal Skupski – Wimbledon (draw)
 – 2020 Summer Olympics (draw)

The following players defended a main circuit title in singles, doubles, or mixed doubles:
Singles
 Novak Djokovic – Australian Open (draw), Wimbledon (draw)
 Jannik Sinner – Sofia (draw)
Doubles
 Nikola Mektić – Monte-Carlo (draw)
 Juan Sebastián Cabal – Barcelona (draw)
 Robert Farah – Barcelona (draw)
 Michael Venus – Hamburg (draw)
 Raven Klaasen – Washington (draw)

Best ranking
The following players achieved their career high ranking in this season inside top 50 (in bold the players who entered the top 10 for the first time):
Singles

 Miomir Kecmanović (reached No. 38 on March 8)
 Daniil Medvedev (reached No. 2 on March 15)
 Ugo Humbert (reached No. 25 on June 21)
 Alex de Minaur (reached No. 15 on June 28)
 Stefanos Tsitsipas (reached No. 3 on August 9)

 Andrey Rublev (reached No. 5 on September 13)
 Matteo Berrettini (reached No. 7 on September 13)
 Cristian Garín (reached No. 17 on September 13)
 Reilly Opelka (reached No. 19 on September 13)
 Lloyd Harris (reached No. 31 on September 13)
 Alexander Bublik (reached No. 34 on September 13)
 Dan Evans (reached No. 22 on September 27)
 Lorenzo Sonego (reached No. 21 on October 4)
 Sebastian Korda (reached No. 38 on October 18)
 Ilya Ivashka (reached No. 43 on October 18)
 Casper Ruud (reached No. 8 on October 25)
 Jannik Sinner (reached No. 9 on November 1)
 Kwon Soon-woo (reached No. 52 on November 1)
 Hubert Hurkacz (reached No. 9 on November 8)
 Cameron Norrie (reached No. 12 on November 8)
 Aslan Karatsev (reached No. 15 on November 8)
 Taylor Fritz (reached No. 23 on November 8)
 Carlos Alcaraz (reached No. 32 on November 8)
 James Duckworth (reached No. 47 on November 8)
 Félix Auger-Aliassime (reached No. 10 on November 15)
 Tommy Paul (reached No. 43 on November 15)

Doubles

 Joran Vliegen (reached No. 28 on June 14)
 Philipp Oswald (reached No. 31 on June 21)
 Neal Skupski (reached No. 14 on August 9)
 Rajeev Ram (reached No. 4 on September 20)
 Matwé Middelkoop (reached No. 26 on October 4)
 Nikola Mektić (reached No. 1 on October 18)
 Max Purcell (reached No. 28 on October 18)
 Hubert Hurkacz (reached No. 44 on October 25)
 Luke Saville (reached No. 23 on November 8)
 Sander Gillé (reached No. 24 on November 8)
 Andrey Golubev (reached No. 25 on November 8)
 Marcelo Arévalo (reached No. 31 on November 8)
 Nikola Ćaćić (reached No. 35 on November 8)
 Hugo Nys (reached No. 41 on November 8)
 Tomislav Brkić (reached No. 46 on November 8)
 Alexander Bublik (reached No. 47 on November 8)
 Tim Pütz (reached No. 17 on November 15)
 Gonzalo Escobar (reached No. 38 on November 15)
 Ariel Behar (reached No. 41 on November 15)

ATP ranking
These are the ATP rankings and yearly ATP race rankings of the top 20 singles players, doubles players and doubles teams at the current date of the 2021 season.

Singles

No. 1 ranking

Doubles

|}

No. 1 ranking

Point distribution
Points are awarded as follows:

Prize money leaders

Best matches by ATPTour.com

Best 5 Grand Slam tournament matches

Best 5 ATP Tour matches

Retirements
The following is a list of notable players (winners of a main tour title, and/or part of the ATP rankings top 100 in singles, or top 100 in doubles, for at least one week) who announced their retirement from professional tennis, became inactive (after not playing for more than 52 weeks), or were permanently banned from playing, during the 2021 season:

  Alexandr Dolgopolov (born 7 November 1988 in Kyiv, Ukraine) joined the professional tour in 2006 and reached a career-high ranking of No. 13 in singles and No. 42 in doubles, both in January 2012. He won three titles in singles and one title in doubles, as well as reaching one Grand Slam quarterfinal in singles. Having been inactive since his wrist injury in 2018 including his attempted comeback which was slated in 2020, Dolgopolov announced his retirement from the ATP Tour in May 2021.
  Guillermo García López (born 4 June 1983 in La Roda, Spain) joined the professional tour in 2002 and reached a career-high ranking of No. 23 in singles in February 2011 and No. 27 in doubles in May 2017. He won five titles in singles and played for the Spanish Davis Cup team. In doubles, he won three titles, reached the final of the 2016 US Open and the semifinals of the 2017 Australian Open. In January 2021, he announced that he would retire after the 2021 season.
  Martin Kližan (born 11 July 1989 in Bratislava, Czechoslovakia (now Slovakia)) joined the professional tour in 2007 and reached a career-high ranking of No. 24 in singles in April 2015 and No. 73 in doubles in May 2015. He won six titles in singles and four titles in doubles. He also won the 2006 Junior French Open and achieved world No. 1 on the junior circuit in January 2007. He won two of his titles at ATP Tour 500 level (Rotterdam 2016 and Hamburg 2016) and recorded four victories over top-10 players with his most notable being against Rafael Nadal at Beijing 2014 who was ranked No. 2 in the world at the time. He played his last match at 2021 Wimbledon qualifying where he lost in the first round to Zdeněk Kolář. He announced his retirement in August.
  Julian Knowle (born 29 April 1974 in Lauterach, Austria), former World No. 6 in doubles, won 19 doubles titles.
  Robert Lindstedt (born 19 March 1977 in Sundbyberg, Sweden), former World No. 3 in doubles, won 23 doubles titles. His last ATP tournament in his career was the 2021 Stockholm Open.
  Paolo Lorenzi  (born 15 December 1981 in Rome, Italy) joined the professional tour in 1999 and reached a career-high ranking of No. 33 in singles in May 2017 and No. 82 in doubles in January 2018. He won one title in singles and one in doubles. He won 21 ATP Challenger Tour titles (third in the all-time leaderboard). He was part of the Italian Davis Cup team. Lorenzi announced the 2021 US Open would be his last professional tournament, and he lost to Maxime Janvier in the second qualifying round.
  Lu Yen-hsun  (born 14 August 1983 in Taipei, Taiwan) joined the professional tour in 2001 and reached a career-high ranking of No. 33 in singles in November 2010 and No. 86 in doubles in January 2005. In singles, he won 29 challenger titles, the most anyone has won, and reached the Quarterfinals in the 2010 Wimbledon Championships. Lu announced in June that Wimbledon and the Tokyo Olympics would be his last tournaments on the tour.
  Leonardo Mayer (born 15 May 1987 in Corrientes, Argentina]) joined the professional tour in 2003 and reached a career-high ranking of No. 21 in singles in June 2015 and No. 48 in doubles in January 2019. He won two titles in singles, both times at the German Open. Mayer retired from tennis in October 2021.
  Jürgen Melzer (born 22 May 1981 in Deutsch-Wagram, Austria) joined the professional tour in 1999 and reached a career-high ranking of No. 8 in singles in April 2011 and No. 6 in doubles in November 2010. He won five titles in singles and reached the semifinals of the 2010 French Open. In doubles, he won 17 titles, including the 2010 Wimbledon Championships and the 2011 US Open. Melzer retired from singles in October 2018, but continued to play doubles competitions on the ATP Tour afterwards. In October 2020, he announced that the 2021 Australian Open would be his last professional tournament. However, he did not play the Australian Open due to the COVID-19 quarantine measures and instead played at the French Open, Wimbledon and the US Open. He played his final tournament on the ATP Tour at the Vienna Open, where he partnered Alexander Zverev.
  Leander Paes (born 17 June 1973 in Kolkata, West Bengal, India) joined the professional tour in 1991 and reached a career-high ranking of No. 1 in doubles in June 1999 and No. 73 in singles in August 1998. Paes had one singles title win on the ATP Tour: the 1998 Hall of Fame Tennis Championships. He won eight doubles and ten mixed doubles Grand Slam titles. Paes achieved the rare men's doubles/mixed doubles titles feat at the 1999 Wimbledon Championships and his mixed doubles Wimbledon title in 2010 made him the second man (after Rod Laver) to win Wimbledon titles in three separate decades. He won a bronze medal for India in singles at the 1996 Olympic Games and competed at consecutive Olympics from 1992 to 2016, making him the first Indian and only tennis player to compete at seven Olympic Games. He is formerly an Indian Davis Cup captain and holds the record for the most Davis Cup doubles wins, with 44 victories between 1990 and 2019. Paes announced on 25 December 2019 that he would bring the curtains down on his illustrious career in 2020, which was to be his farewell season on the professional tour. However he announced he is hoping to participate in the 2021 Tokyo Olympics before putting an end to his career at the end of the calendar year 2021.
  Viktor Troicki  (born 10 February 1986 in Belgrade, SR Serbia, Yugoslavia (now Serbia)) joined the professional tour in 2006 and reached a career-high ranking of 12 in singles in June 2011 and 49 in doubles in October 2010. He won three titles in singles and 2 in doubles. In team competitions, he was part of the Serbia Davis Cup team who won the Davis Cup in 2010, as well as part of the Serbian team who won the inaugural ATP Cup in 2020. Troicki announced on 17 June 2021 that Wimbledon would be his last professional tournament.

Comebacks
The following is a list of notable players (winners of a main tour title, and/or part of the ATP rankings top 100 in singles, or top 100 in doubles, for at least one week) who returned from retirement during the 2021 season:

  Xavier Malisse

See also

2021 ATP Challenger Tour
2021 ITF Men's World Tennis Tour
2021 WTA Tour

References

Notes

External links
Association of Tennis Professionals (ATP) Tour official website
International Tennis Federation (ITF) official website

 
ATP Tour seasons
ATP Tour